The Fruit Basket or Reversible Head with a Fruit Basket is the c.1590 oil on panel still life by Giuseppe Arcimboldo, now French and Company in New York. When reversing, it shows an anthropomorphic head. The same painter also produced The Cook and The Gardener.

References

Paintings by Giuseppe Arcimboldo
1590s paintings